Lake Serene is an alpine lake located in Snohomish County, Washington near Mount Index and above Bridal Veil Falls. The lake is a popular area for hiking and fishing.

See also
Bridal Veil Falls
Skykomish River

References

Lakes of Washington (state)
Lakes of Snohomish County, Washington